Dalhousie station is a CTrain light rail station in Dalhousie, Calgary, Alberta, Canada. Also located adjacent to Varsity Estates. It opened on December 15, 2003, as part of a 2.8 km (1.73 miles) extension of the Northwest line, and was the terminal station of the NW line until June 14, 2009.

The station is located in the median of Crowchild Trail, just east of 53 Street Northwest and is 9 km northwest of the 7 Avenue & 9 Street SW interlocking. The station opened on December 15, 2003, and was the first CTrain station to open with a four-car platform. Since then, all new extension stations have opened with four-car platforms.

The station has 760 parking spaces built near the Dalhousie Shopping Centre. In 2003, the park and ride lot was very crowded and would fill up very early in the morning. Since Crowfoot station opened in 2009 with almost double the spaces as Dalhousie, the situation has eased somewhat.

Pedestrian overpasses connect the communities of Varsity and Dalhousie over Crowchild Trail. Two escalators, a set of stairs, and an elevator provide access down to the platform. 

In 2008, the station registered an average of 18,300 boardings per weekday.

References

CTrain stations
Railway stations in Canada opened in 2003
2003 establishments in Alberta